This is a list of all tornadoes that were confirmed by local offices of the National Weather Service in the United States from August to October 2013.

August

August 1 event

August 3 event

August 5 event

August 6 event

August 7 event

August 11 event

August 12 event

August 13 event

August 14 event

August 18 event

August 21 event

August 26 event

August 27 event

August 29 event

August 30 event

August 31 event

September

September 1 event

September 7 event

September 10 event

September 11 event

September 12 event

September 15 event

September 16 event

September 17 event

September 18 event

September 20 event

September 21 event

September 22 event

September 30 event

October

October 1 event

October 3 event

October 4 event

October 5 event

October 7 event

October 8 event

October 11 event

October 12 event

October 18 event

October 21 event

October 31 event

See also
Tornadoes of 2013

Notes

References

Tornadoes of 2013
2013, 08
August 2013 events in the United States
September 2013 events in the United States
October 2013 events in the United States